Maximiliano Ariel García (born 25 January 1985) is an Argentine professional footballer who plays as a centre-back.

Career
García's career began in the system of Almagro, which preceded a move to Flandria of Primera B Metropolitana; two appearances followed. In 2003, García completed a move to Primera D Metropolitana's Leandro N. Alem. He remained with the club for seven years, departing in 2010 following nineteen goals in two hundred league appearances; ten goals in eighty-four games came from 2007 in Primera C Metropolitana. 2010 saw the defender join Primera B Nacional team Deportivo Merlo, with his first professional appearance in nine years arriving on 14 August 2010 versus Gimnasia y Esgrima. He was selected in a further twenty-one games.

In January 2013, García joined fourth tier Argentino. Seven months later, Primera B Metropolitana side Los Andes signed García. He scored his first pro goal during a win away to Deportivo Morón in August 2014, in a season that ended with promotion to Primera B Nacional. On 30 June 2018, after one hundred and ten appearances and six goals for Los Andes, García rejoined former youth team Almagro in Primera B Nacional. He'd appear in thirty matches in all competitions, which preceded a move to Comunicaciones of Primera B Metropolitana in July 2019. A year later, García penned terms with tier two team Villa Dálmine.

Career statistics
.

References

External links

1985 births
Living people
People from Moreno Partido
Argentine footballers
Association football defenders
Primera Nacional players
Primera B Metropolitana players
Primera D Metropolitana players
Primera C Metropolitana players
Flandria footballers
Club Leandro N. Alem players
Deportivo Merlo footballers
Argentino de Merlo footballers
Club Atlético Los Andes footballers
Club Almagro players
Club Comunicaciones footballers
Villa Dálmine footballers
Sportspeople from Buenos Aires Province